The CEGEP of Saint-Jérôme or Cégep de Saint-Jérôme (CSTJ) in French is a post-secondary education school in the Laurentides region of province of Quebec. There's three campuses affiliated to the CSTJ, the main one is located at Saint-Jérôme. The two others are in Mont-Tremblant and Mont-Laurier.

History 
The college traces its origins to the merger of several institutions which became public ones in 1967, when the Quebec system of CEGEPs was created. The building had been a Catholic school directed by the sisters of Saint Anne. The Cégep de Saint-Jérôme gained its independence in 1970. At its start it had two wings, wing A built in 1929 and wing B built in 1963. In the 1970s, three new wings were constructed. In 2007, a new wing was constructed for the Centre d'études universitaires des Laurentides, a branch campus of the Université du Québec en Outaouais. In 2017, the K wing has been inaugurated to respond to the growing number of students in the college.

Programs
The Province of Quebec awards a Diploma of Collegial Studies for two types of programs: two years of pre-university studies or three years of vocational (technical) studies. The pre-university programs, which take two years to complete, cover the subject matters which roughly correspond to the additional year of high school given elsewhere in Canada in preparation for a chosen field in university. The technical programs, which take three years to complete, applies to students who wish to pursue a skill trade. In addition Continuing education and services to business are provided.

Notable alumni 

 Marquise Lepage (born 1959), producer, screenwriter, and film and television director

See also
List of colleges in Quebec 
Higher education in Quebec

References

External links 
Cégep de Saint-Jérôme, in French

Saint-Jerome
Buildings and structures in Saint-Jérôme
Education in Laurentides